Kyrgyzstan–Malaysia relations refers to foreign relations between Kyrgyzstan and Malaysia. Kyrgyzstan has an embassy in Kuala Lumpur, while Malaysia embassy in Tashkent, Uzbekistan is also accredited to Kyrgyzstan.

History 
Diplomatic relations between the two countries been establish in March 1992 with the embassy of Kyrgyzstan been establish in 1997 with the aid of Malaysian Government. In 1995, the President of Kyrgyzstan Askar Akaev has conducted a first official visit to Malaysia. The Malaysian Prime Minister Mahathir Mohamad then made a reciprocal official visit to the Kyrgyzstan in 1996. Since that, the bilateral relations are greatly improved in the sector of trade and economy, investment, cultural, humanitarian and other spheres of mutual interest.

Education relations 
There is also some Kyrgyz live in Malaysia basically due to working or attending education which has led to a mixed marriages between Kyrgyz and Malaysian.

Economic relations 
Currently, the Republic of Kyrgyzstan wants to enhance closer economic ties with Malaysia. During a meeting with the Former Malaysian Prime Minister Najib Razak, Kyrgyzstan has announce his intention to seeks Malaysian investment in the country. The bilateral trade between the two countries remain small at about U$3 million due to no air direct link between the two capital cities. But, many Malaysian companies has started to looking a possibilities in investment on the country.

Further reading 
 Deputy Foreign Minister of Kyrgyzstan and Ambassador of Malaysia to the KR discussed bilateral cooperation

References 

 
Malaysia
Bilateral relations of Malaysia